The 2014 FINA Women's Water Polo World Cup was the 16th edition of the event, organised by the world's governing body in aquatics, the International Swimming Federation (FINA). The event took place in Khanty-Mansiysk, Russia from 12 to 17 August 2014.

The United States won the gold medal by defeating Australia 10-6 in the final. Spain captured bronze, beating China 7-5.

Format
8 teams qualified for the 2014 FINA World Cup. They are split into two groups of 4 teams. After playing a round-robin every team advanced to the quarterfinals. The best ranked team of Group A played against the fourth ranked team of Group B, the second ranked team of Group A against the third ranked team of Group B the third ranked team of Group A against the second ranked team of Group B and the fourth ranked team of Group A against the best ranked team of Group B. The winners of those quarterfinals advanced to the semis and played out the champion while the losers of the quarterfinals competed in placement matches.

Groups

Preliminary round

Group A
All times are YEKT (UTC+5)

Group B
All times are YEKT (UTC+5)

Final rounds

5th place bracket

5th–8th place classification 
All times are YEKT (UTC+5)

7th-place match 
All times are YEKT (UTC+5)

5th-place match 
All times are YEKT (UTC+5)

Championship bracket

Quarterfinals 
All times are YEKT (UTC+5)

Semifinals 
All times are YEKT (UTC+5)

Bronze-medal match 
All times are YEKT (UTC+5)

Gold-medal match 
All times are YEKT (UTC+5)

Final standings

Team Roster
Sami Hill, Alys Williams, Melissa Seidemann, Rachel Fattal, Caroline Clark, Maggie Steffens, Courtney Mathewson, Kiley Neushul, Jillian Kraus, Kaleigh Gilchrist, Annika Dries, Kami Craig, Ashleigh Johnson. Head coach: Adam Krikorian.

Individual awards
Most Valuable Player

Best Goalkeeper

Best Scorer
 — 22 goals
Media All Star Team
 – Goalkeeper
 – Centre forward

References

"fina.org August 17, 2014"

F
FINA Women's Water Polo World Cup
International water polo competitions hosted by Russia
Water Polo World Cup
Women's water polo in Russia
Sport in Khanty-Mansiysk